Wertland Street Historic District is a national historic district located at Charlottesville, Virginia. The district encompasses 25 contributing buildings in a two block residential section of the city of Charlottesville. It was primarily developed starting in the 1880s.  Notable buildings include the Wertenbaker House (c. 1830), McKennie-Miller House (c. 1842), Ward-Brown-Gay House (1889), Marshall-Dabney-Cubbage House (1892), Bryan-Stallings House (1900), and Watson House (1905).

It was listed on the National Register of Historic Places in 1985.

References

Historic districts on the National Register of Historic Places in Virginia
Buildings and structures in Charlottesville, Virginia
National Register of Historic Places in Charlottesville, Virginia